Hermann Schaefer (12 September 1885 – 1962) was a German general during the Second World War.

Biography
In 1885, Hermann Schaefer was born in Metz, in Alsace-Lorraine. Schaefer fought during the First World War, with the rank of Oberleutnant ('First Lieutenant') and eventually Hauptmann ('Captain'). He made a career in the Reichswehr, then in the German army. During the Second World War, Hermann Schaefer participated in many military operations in Poland and Italy. He obtained the rank of Generalmajor in February 1941.

Hermann Schaefer died in 1962 in Kassel, West Germany.

Decorations
 Eisernes Kreuz

Sources 
 (de) Biography of Hermann Schaefer

1885 births
1962 deaths
Prussian Army personnel
Major generals of the German Army (Wehrmacht)
Military personnel from Metz
People from Alsace-Lorraine
German colonial people in Kamerun
Reichswehr personnel
Recipients of the Iron Cross (1914), 1st class